Greg Smith (c. 1949 – 3 September 2002) was the former international rugby union coach of both the Australian national rugby union team (known widely as the Wallabies) and the Fijian national rugby union team.

He is probably best remembered for guiding the Australian team to a 12-match winning streak across Europe beating Italy, Scotland, Ireland and Wales.

References

1949 births
2002 deaths
Australian rugby union coaches
Australia national rugby union team coaches
Australian expatriate sportspeople in Fiji
Fiji national rugby union team coaches